The 1952 United States presidential election in Washington took place on November 4, 1952, as part of the 1952 United States presidential election. Voters chose nine representatives, or electors, to the Electoral College, who voted for president and vice president.

Washington was won by Columbia University President Dwight D. Eisenhower (R–New York), running with California Senator Richard Nixon, with 54.33% of the popular vote, against Adlai Stevenson (D–Illinois), running with Alabama Senator John Sparkman, with 44.69% of the popular vote.

This was the last time the Republican Party carried Pacific County until Donald Trump did so in 2016, and the last time that a Republican won a majority of the vote in Pacific County, as Trump only received pluralities in 2016 and 2020.

Results

Results by county

See also
 United States presidential elections in Washington (state)

References

Washington (state)
1952
1952 Washington (state) elections